Kumbarganvi is a village in Dharwad district of Karnataka, India.

Demographics 
As of the 2011 Census of India there were 432 households in Kumbarganvi and a total population of 2,110 consisting of 1,069 males and 1,041 females. There were 319 children ages 0-6.

References

Villages in Dharwad district